Thuận An is a city of Bình Dương Province in the Southeast region of Vietnam. As of November 3, 2021 the city had a population of 618,984. The town covers an area of 83.7 km². The center of this town - Lái Thiêu - is famous for its ceramic and fruits.

Administrative divisions
Thuận An has nine wards (Lái Thiêu, An Thạnh, Vĩnh Phú, Bình Hòa, Bình Chuẩn, Thuận Giao, An Phú, Hưng Định and Bình Nhâm) and one rural commune (An Sơn).

Geography
Thuận An Dĩ An to the east, Thủ Dầu Một to the north. District 12, Ho Chi Minh City to the west and Thủ Đức to the south.

References

Populated places in Bình Dương province
Districts of Bình Dương province
Cities in Vietnam